Joslyn Davis is a former on-air host and producer for ClevverTV, a brand formerly owned and operated by Defy Media. She now appears in YouTube videos produced by Shared Media alongside her friend Lily Marston.

Early life
She completed internships in the media world while attending the University of California, Irvine where she graduated with a Bachelor's in English and a minor in Spanish. She also spent a semester abroad studying at Carlos III University in Madrid, Spain.

Career
Davis was an On-air host and producer for ClevverTV as well as executive producer at Clevver Media who has also hosted and reported for the Project Runway website, Designing Spaces: Think Green on HGTV, Teen.com, California Adventure TV and on Australia's Top National morning show, Sunrise. In 2016 Davis competed in The Amazing Race 28.

In June 2019, she and Lily Marston announced that they had started a company, Shared Media, where she is currently working.

Filmography

Television

Web

References

External links
 

1982 births
Living people
The Amazing Race (American TV series) contestants
American television hosts
American women television presenters
University of California, Irvine alumni
American YouTubers
People from Downey, California